Forest Park School District may refer to:

Forest Park School District (Michigan), in Iron County, Michigan
Forest Park School District 91, in Illinois